Homoeoxipha is a genus of "sword-tail crickets", in the subfamily Trigonidiinae and the tribe Trigonidiini.

Species
Species are recordede from tropical Africa and in Asia: India, China, Japan, Indochina, Malesia through to Australia.  The Orthoptera Species File lists:
 Homoeoxipha amoena Bolívar, 1914
 Homoeoxipha eurylobus Ma, Liu & Zhang, 2016
 Homoeoxipha fuscipennis Chopard, 1927
 Homoeoxipha gracilis Chopard, 1967
 Homoeoxipha histeriformis (Bolívar, 1914)
 Homoeoxipha lycoides (Walker, 1869) - type species (as Phyllopalpus lycoides Walker)
 Homoeoxipha nigriceps Chopard, 1962
 Homoeoxipha nigripennis Chopard, 1967
 Homoeoxipha nigripes Xia & Liu, 1993
 Homoeoxipha obliterata (Caudell, 1927)
 Homoeoxipha thoracica (Chopard, 1915)

References

External links
 

Ensifera genera
Trigonidiidae
Orthoptera of Asia
Orthoptera of Africa